"I Just Can't Help Believing" is a song written by Barry Mann and Cynthia Weil.

The song was most successful after it was recorded by B. J. Thomas and released as a single in 1970. It went to No. 9 on the Billboard Hot 100 singles chart and spent one week at No. 1 on the Easy Listening (adult contemporary) chart.

Thomas re-recorded "I Just Can't Help Believing" with Vince Gill for his 2013 album The Living Room Sessions. This was released as a single on June 3, 2013.

Elvis Presley cover 

"I Just Can't Help Believing" was recorded by Elvis Presley in 1970 as a track on his album That's the Way It Is. A live version was released as a single in the UK in November 1971, peaking at No. 6. Presley's version also reached No. 6 in South Africa, and No. 12 in Ireland.

Chart history

Weekly charts 
B. J. Thomas

Elvis Presley version

Year-end charts

Other cover versions 
 The first release was as a single by Barry Mann on Capitol Records, which was reviewed in Billboard magazine on June 22, 1968.
 Bobby Vee covered it on his 1969 LP Gates, Grills and Railings.
 Bobby Doyle released it as a single in 1969 on the Warner Brothers label.
 Leonard Nimoy released a version on his 1969 album The Touch of Leonard Nimoy.
 David Frizzell's version reached No. 36 on the U.S. Billboard Country Singles chart in 1970.
 Filipina singer-actress Nora Aunor released it on her 1971 studio album The Song of My Life.
 The disco cover band Boys Town Gang released a version in the UK in July 1983, which reached No. 82.
 Barry Mann recorded the song again in 2000 for his solo album Soul & Inspiration.

See also 
List of number-one adult contemporary singles of 1970 (U.S.)

References 

1970 singles
2013 singles
B. J. Thomas songs
Elvis Presley songs
Vince Gill songs
Songs written by Barry Mann
Male vocal duets 
1969 songs
Songs with lyrics by Cynthia Weil
Boys Town Gang songs
David Frizzell songs